Axxess may refer to:

 Axxess Technology Solutions, home healthcare company headquartered in Dallas, Texas.
 Axxess & Ace, Michael Krassner album
 Axxess (South Africa), a South African internet service provider
 Flight Design Axxess, a German hang glider design
 Nissan Axxess, a car
 Axxess Integrate, a Metra Electronics car audio interface products company.
 WrestleMania Axxess, a professional wrestling event

See also
Axess (disambiguation)
Access (disambiguation)
Axes (disambiguation)